Bill Conley is an American football coach who is the head coach of the Ohio Force of Major League Football.  He previously served as the head football coach at Ohio Dominican University from 2010 to 2015, compiling a record of 46–21. Conley played college football at Ohio State University under head coach Woody Hayes. He later served as an assistant at his alma mater under  head coaches John Cooper and Jim Tressel.

Head coaching record

References

Year of birth missing (living people)
Living people
Ohio Dominican Panthers football coaches
Ohio State Buckeyes football coaches
Ohio State Buckeyes football players